The Women's 69 kg event at the 2010 South American Games was held over March 28 at 16:00.

Medalists

Results

New Records

References
Final

69kg W